was the lead ship of ten s, and first of six to be built for the Imperial Japanese Navy under the Circle One Program (Maru Ichi Keikaku).

History
Despite being one of the most powerful classes of destroyers in the world at the time of their completion, none survived the Pacific War.
Shiratsuyu, built at the Sasebo Naval Arsenal was laid down on 14 November 1933, launched on 5 April 1935 and commissioned on 7 September 1936.

Operational history
At the time of the attack on Pearl Harbor, Shiratsuyu was assigned to Destroyer Division 27 of Destroyer Squadron 1 of the IJN 1st Fleet, and remained in Japanese home waters as part of the protection of the Japanese battleship forces. From mid-January 1942, she was assisted to escorting convoys between Japan and Taiwan, and in mid-February escorted the aircraft carrier  to Davao and back to Hashirajima. At the end of May, the ship escorted the cruisers  and  back to Kure, from which it was assigned to Admiral Shirō Takasu’s, Aleutians Guard Force during the Battle of Midway on 4–6 June. On 14 July she was assigned back to the IJN 2nd Fleet and returned to Truk in mid-August, from which she was deployed as a high speed transport to carry troops to reoccupy Makin Atoll after the Makin Raid.

Until mid-September, Shiratsuyu remained based out of Jaluit in the Marshall Islands, but from October was deployed to the Solomon Islands, where she made several "Tokyo Express" high speed transport runs to Guadalcanal. On an attack mission to Guadalcanal on 25 October, she assisted in sinking the American tugboat  and damaging the high-speed minesweeper . She participated in the First Naval Battle of Guadalcanal on the night of 12–13 November 1942, rescuing survivors from the torpedoed battleship , but was not involved in combat. On 23 November, while on a transport run to Lae, she rescued survivors from the destroyer , which she then scuttled with a torpedo.

However, on her next mission to Buna on 28 November, Shiratsuyu took a direct hit from a bomb during an attack by USAAF B-17 Flying Fortress bombers in her bow, which required emergency repairs at Rabaul, Truk, and Saipan before she should reach Sasebo on 25 February 1943 for complete repairs. She returned to active duty on 20 July 1943 with the IJN 2nd Fleet, escorting the aircraft carrier  from Yokosuka to Truk and back in late August. She returned to Rabaul in mid-October, after which she was assigned to troop transport runs to Qavuvu.

During the Battle of Empress Augusta Bay on 2 November, she collided with the destroyer , after which she was strafed by American aircraft, leaving four dead and two wounded, and necessitating a return to Sasebo in November. During this refit, one gun turret was removed and replaced by two triple  25-mm anti-aircraft guns.

On 31 January, she rescued survivors of torpedoed Yasukuni Maru at Truk. From February through April, she was part of the escort for the battleship . From the end of April, she was reassigned to Take Ichi convoy duty, escorting troop convoys from China to the Philippines and other points in southeast Asia.

Shiratsuyu was attacked on 8 June off of Biak by US Navy aircraft, with four killed and five crewmen injured. Of her crew, 104 were killed, including her Captain (Cdr Kuro Matsuda). She was removed from the navy list on 10 August 1944.

Notes

References 

OCLC 77257764

External links

Shiratsuyu-class destroyers
World War II destroyers of Japan
World War II shipwrecks in the Philippine Sea
Ships built by Sasebo Naval Arsenal
World War II shipwrecks in the Pacific Ocean
1935 ships
Maritime incidents in June 1944